Playback is a 1962 British crime film directed by Quentin Lawrence and starring Margit Saad, Barry Foster and Nigel Green. It was based on a short story by Edgar Wallace Part of the Edgar Wallace Mysteries film series made at Merton Park Studios, the film's sets were designed by the art director Peter Mullins.

Cast
 Margit Saad as Lisa Shillack
 Barry Foster as Dave Hollis
 Victor Platt as Inspector Gorman
 Dinsdale Landen as Joe Ross
 George Pravda as Simon Shillack
 Nigel Green as Ralph Monk
 Jerold Wells as Inspector Parkes
 Grace Arnold as Miss Wilson
 Donald Tandy as Police Sergeant
 Kenneth Fortescue as First Tennis Player
 Peter Stephens as First Drunk
 Barry Warren as 	Second Tennis Player
 Billy Milton as Second Drunk
 Peter Thomas as Constable Wilkie
 Edgar Driver as Porter
 Edward Davies as Waiter
 Dickie Owen as Waiter
 June Murphy as First Waitress
 Tamara Hinchco as Second Waitress
 Arch Taylor as Doorman
 Monti DeLyle as Croupier

References

Bibliography
 Goble, Alan. The Complete Index to Literary Sources in Film. Walter de Gruyter, 1999.

External links

1962 films
British crime films
1962 crime films
Films set in England
Merton Park Studios films
Films directed by Quentin Lawrence
Films based on short fiction
Edgar Wallace Mysteries
1960s English-language films
1960s British films